UniSA–Australia is an Australian cycling team sponsored by the University of South Australia, entering young Australian riders in the Tour Down Under stage race held in late January in and around Adelaide.

2020
The team members for the 2020 Tour Down Under and 2020 Women’s Tour Down Under respectively are:

Men's Team

Women's Team

2019
The team members for the 2019 Tour Down Under and 2019 Women’s Tour Down Under respectively are:

Men's Team

Women's Team

2018
The team members for the 2018 Tour Down Under and 2018 Women's Tour Down Under respectively are:

Men's Team

Women's Team

2017
The team members for the 2017 Tour Down Under are:

2016
The team members for the 2016 Tour Down Under are:

2015
The team members for the 2015 Tour Down Under were:

References

Cycling teams based in Australia